Agnieszka Kosmatka (born 17 August 1978) is a retired Polish volleyball player. She was part of the Poland women's national volleyball team.

She participated in the 2007 FIVB Volleyball World Grand Prix.

References

External links
http://www.cev.lu/competition-area/PlayerDetails.aspx?TeamID=2514&PlayerID=4731&ID=225
FIVB World Grand Prix 2007
Women Volleyball XXII European Championship 2001

1978 births
Living people
Polish women's volleyball players
Place of birth missing (living people)